Pizza is a concept EP and the third studio release by Horse the Band, released September 5, 2006 through Koch Records. The EP was recorded in place of Horse the Band not finishing their time on The Stampeading Machines Tour. 550 limited edition copies of the EP were pressed in the 10" vinyl format, sold in cardboard pizza boxes, on the band's label LIF Records.

Overview

According to the band's MySpace blog, Horse the Band ended their time on "The Stampeding Machines Tour", almost halfway through in order to record the EP. One of their bulletins states:

While recording the EP, fans sent Horse the Band pizza and are included in the liner notes. As a joke, while playing a 2007 show in Chicago, singer Nathan Winneke blamed the crowd (and the city itself) for being responsible for the EP, in a mockingly unaffectionate tone. The band then proceeded to play the song "Anti-Pizza".

In a 2008 interview, keyboardist Erik Engstrom stated that if he could delete anything from Horse the Band's catalog, it would be the Pizza EP.

The EP was recorded at 4th Street Recording in Santa Monica, CA.

Track listing

Personnel
Horse the Band
 Nathan Winneke – vocals
 David Isen – guitar
 Erik Engstrom – keyboards
 Dashiell "Dash" Arkenstone – bass
 Chris Prophet – drums

Production
Tracking by Chris Mullings at 4th Street Recording
Mastered by Tom Baker at Precision Mastering
Packaging design by LevinMedia

References

Horse the Band albums
2006 EPs